Bolivia is a predominantly Christian country, with adherents of Islam representing a very small minority. Due to secular nature of the Bolivia's constitution, Muslims are free to proselytize and build places of worship in the country. Statistics for Islam in Bolivia estimate a Muslim population of around two thousand, representing 0.017% out of the total population of 11,220,000 inhabitants.

In 2004 the first official Sunni mosque, the Yebel An Nur Mosque, was founded in 2004 in La Paz. The Yebel An Nur Mosque remains self-funded with close ties to the Sunni Bolivian Islamic Center of Santa Cruz while the As-Salam Mosque receives both Sunni and Shia followers, connections, and funding.

See also
Islam by country

References

External links
Islam in Bolivia
Sunnis in Bolivia

 
Bolivia
Bol